Rezwana Choudhury Bannya is a Bangladeshi singer and academic. She is an exponent of Rabindra Sangeet, the songs written and composed by Rabindranath Tagore. She is regarded as a legendary Tagore singer by Tagore music aficionados. She has won numerous awards including Bangladesh's highest civilian award the Independence Day Award (2016).

Early life
Rezwana was born in Rangpur, Bangladesh to her parents Mazharuddin Khan and Ismat Ara Khan. Her early singing lessons began with her uncle Abdul Ali that continued later under the tutelage of Sanjida Khatun and Atiqul Islam at Chhayanaut and Bulbul Academy of Fine Arts (BAFA) in Dhaka.  As she continued taking lessons in music and singing, she also joined the Economics Program at the university of Dhaka after completion of her schooling.  However, soon her inner self came to the realization that music was her 
destiny.  She received a scholarship from the Indian Council for Cultural Relations (ICCR) to study in Sangit Bhavana at Santiniketan, the university that was founded by Tagore himself. She took lessons from artistes including Kanika Bandyopadhyay, Nilima Sen, Sailajaranjan Majumdar, Santidev Ghosh, Gora Sarbadhikary, Manju Bandyopadhyay and Asesh Bandyopadhyay. Years after receiving her Master's degree from
Visva-Bharati, she trained under Kanika Banerjie (Mohor Di) in private sessions for an extended period of time, as she recalled in the Musiana episode, "Meeting Mohar Di", hosted by Srikanto Acharya.

In 2021 she completed her research on Rabindra Sangeet at the University of Dhaka, for which she received the degree of Doctor of Philosophy.

Career
Bannya is currently Professor and founding chair of the Department of Dance at the University of Dhaka; previously, she had been an Associate Professor in the Department of Music at the same university. In 1992 she founded Shurer Dhara, a prestigious music school in Dhaka. with a focus on Ranbindra Sangeet. Bannya is currently Honorary Dean, Faculty of Performing Arts & Chairperson of Music Department of Tagore University of Creative Arts. In 2010, in order to commemorate the 150th birth anniversary of Rabindranath Tagore, she brought out a complete audio version of 2,233 songs in Tagore's Gitobitan, which was titled Sruti Gitobitan..

Awards
 Ananda Sangeet Puroshkar for being the best female Rabindra Sangeet artist (2002) 
 Gaane Gaane Gunijon Shongbardhona (2011)
 Sangeet Samman Puroshkar from the Ministry of Culture, India in 2013
 Independence Day Award (2016)
 Banga Bhushan (2017)
 Firoza Begum Memorial Gold Medal (2017)
Sangeet Maha Samman (2017) by the Government of West Bengal
Doctorate of Arts honoris causa'' from Asian University for Women (2019)
Lifetime Achievement Award conferred by Oikko.com.bd Channel I (2022)

Albums

References

External links 

 

Living people
Year of birth missing (living people)
21st-century Bangladeshi women singers
21st-century Bangladeshi singers
20th-century Bangladeshi women singers
20th-century Bangladeshi singers
Rabindra Sangeet exponents
Academic staff of the University of Dhaka
Visva-Bharati University alumni
Recipients of the Independence Day Award
20th-century women composers